Baseball Heroes is a 1992 baseball video game developed and published by Atari Corporation in North America and Europe exclusively for the Atari Lynx.

Gameplay 

Baseball Heroes is a baseball game.

Development and release

Reception 

Robert A. Jung reviewed the game which was published on IGN. In his final verdict he wrote "Baseball Heroes is a very good translation of the sport, though not a perfect game. It has a few rough spots that will try some people, but for the most part this is a quality title and a showcase game for the Lynx." Giving it a final score of 8 out of 10.

References

External links 
 Baseball Heroes at AtariAge
 Baseball Heroes at GameFAQs
 Baseball Heroes at MobyGames

1992 video games
Atari games
Atari Lynx games
Atari Lynx-only games
Baseball video games
Multiplayer and single-player video games
Video games developed in the United States